The XLVII Legislature of the Congress of Mexico met from 1 September 1967 to 31 August 1970. Members of the upper house of the Congress were selected in the elections of 5 July 1964 for a period of six years while members of the lower house of the Congress were selected in the elections of 2 July 1967 for a period of three years.

Senate

Composition

Leadership

Senators by federative entity

Chamber of Deputies

Deputies by federative entity

Aguascalientes
 1. Francisco Guel Jiménez (PRI)
 2. José Refugio Esparza Reyes (PRI)

Baja California
 1. Francisco Muñoz Franco (PRI)
 2. Gustavo Aubanel Vallejo (PRI)
 3. Celestino Salcedo Monteón (PRI)

Territory of Baja California Sur
 Ángel César Mendoza Arámburo (PRI)

Campeche
 1. Ramón Alcalá Ferrera (PRI)
 2. Manuel Pavón Bahaine (PRI)

Chiapas
 1. Martha Luz Rincon Castillejos (PRI)
 2. Roberto Coello Lescieur (PRI)
 3. Edgar Robledo Santiago (PRI)
 4. Daniel Robles Sasso (PRI)
 6. Patrocinio González Garrido (PRI)

Chihuahua
 1. Mariano Valenzuela Ceballos (PRI)
 2.  (PRI)
 3.  (PRI)
 4.  (PRI)
 5. Everardo Escárcega López (PRI)
 6.  (PRI)

Coahuila
 1. José de las Fuentes Rodríguez (PRI)
 2.  (PRI)
 3.  (PRI)
 4.  (PRI)

Colima
 1. Ricardo Guzmán Nava (PRI)
 2. Ramiro Santana Ugarte (PRI)

Federal District
 1. Pedro Luis Bartilotti Perea (PRI)
 2. José del Valle de la Cajiga (PRI)
 3. Ernesto Quiñones López (PRI)
 4. Octavio Andrés Hernández González (PRI)
 5. Gilberto Aceves Alcocer (PRI)
 6. Ignacio Castillo Mena (PRI)
 7. Jorge Durán Chávez (PRI)
 8. Eleuterio Macedo Váldez (PRI)
 9. Javier Blanco Sánchez (PAN)
 10. Manuel Álvarez González (PRI)
 11. Pedro Rosas Rodríguez (PRI)
 12. Martín Guaida Lara (PRI)
 13. Joaquín Gamboa Pascoe (PRI)
 14. Alberto Briseño Ruiz (PRI)
 15. Enrique Bermúdez Olvera (PRI)
 16. Fernando Córdoba Lobo (PRI)
 17. Raúl Noriega Ondovilla (PRI)
 18. Joaquín del Olmo Martínez (PRI)
 19. Adolfo Ruiz Sosa (PRI)
 20. Ignacio Guzmán Garduño (PRI)
 21. Oscar Ramírez Mijares (PRI)
 22. María Guadalupe Aguirre Soria (PRI)
 23. Hilario Galguera Torres (PRI)
 24. María Elena Jiménez Lozano (PRI)

Durango
 1. Agustín Ruiz Soto (PRI)
 2. J. Natividad Ibarra Rayas (PRI)
 3. Juan Antonio Orozco Fierro (PRI)
 4. José Antonio Ramírez M. (PRI)

Guanajuato
 1. (PRI)
 2.  (PRI)
 3.  (PRI)
 4.  (PRI)
 5.  (PRI)
 6.  (PRI)
 7.  (PRI)
 8.  (PRI)
 9.  (PRI)

Guerrero
 1. Juan Pablo Leyva Córdova (PRI)
 2. Humberto Acevedo Astudillo (PRI)
 3. Alberto Díaz Rodríguez (PRI)
 4. Israel Nogueda Otero (PRI)
 5. Eusebio Mendoza Avila (PRI)

Hidalgo
 1. Adalberto Cravioto Meneses (PRI)
 2. Raúl Vargas Ortiz (PRI)
 3. Sergio Butrón Casas (PRI)
 4. José Gonzálo Badillo Ortiz (PRI)
 5. Humberto Lugo Gil (PRI)

Jalisco
 1.  (PRI)
 2.  (PRI)
 3.  (PRI)
 4.  (PRI)
 5.  (PRI)
 6.  (PRI)
 7.  (PRI)
 8.  (PRI)
 9.  (PRI)
 10.  (PRI)
 11.  (PRI)
 12.  (PRI)

State of Mexico
 1. (PRI)
 2.  (PRI)
 3.  (PRI)
 4. Ignacio Pichardo Pagaza (PRI)
 5.  (PRI)
 6.  (PRI)
 7.  (PRI)
 8.  (PRI)
 9.  (PRI)

Michoacán
 1. (PRI)
 2.  (PRI)
 3.  (PRI)
 4.  (PRI)
 5.  (PRI)
 6.  (PRI)
 7.  (PRI)
 8.  (PRI)
 9.  (PRI)

Morelos
 1. Javier Bello Yllanes (PRI)
 2. Elpidio Perdomo García (PRI)

Nayarit
 1. Roberto Gómez Reyes (PRI)
 2. Emilio M. González Parra (PRI)

Nuevo León
 1. Pedro F. Quintanilla (PRI)
 2. Luis M. Farías (PRI)
 3. Virgilio Cárdenas García (PRI)
 4. Graciano Bortoni Urtega (PRI)
 5. Eloy Treviño Martínez (PRI)

Oaxaca
 1. (PRI)
 2.  (PRI)
 3.  (PRI)
 4.  (PRI)
 5.  (PRI)
 6.  (PRI)
 7.  (PRI)
 8.  (PRI)
 9.  (PRI)

Puebla
 1. Blas Chumacero Sánchez (PRI)
 2.  (PRI)
 3.  (PRI)
 4.  (PRI)
 5.  (PRI)
 6.  (PRI)
 7.  (PRI)
 8.  (PRI)
 9.  (PRI)
 10.  (PRI)

Querétaro
 1. José Arana Morán (PRI)
 2. Enrique Redentor Albarrán (PRI)

Territory of Quintana Roo
 Eliezer Castro Souza (PRI)

San Luis Potosí
 1. Jorge Márquez Borjas (PRI)
 2. Francisco Padrón Puyou (PRI)
 3. Florencio Salazar Martínez (PRI)
 4. Guillermo Fonseca Álvarez (PRI)
 5. José de Jesús González L. (PRI)

Sinaloa
 1.  (PRI)
 2.  (PRI)
 3.  (PRI)
 4.  (PRI)

Sonora
 1. Ignacio Guzmán Gómez (PRI)
 2. Guillermo Núñez Keith (PRI)
 3. Enrique Fuentes Martínez (PRI)
 4. Francisco Villanueva Castelo (PRI)
 5. Carlos Armando Biebrich Torres (PRI)

Tabasco
 1. Mario Trujillo García (PRI)
 2. Agapito Domínguez Canabal (PRI)

Tamaulipas
 1. Antonio Guerra Díaz (PRI)
 2. Cristóbal Guevara Delmas (PRI)
 3. Elías Piña Jesús (PRI)
 4. Elvia Rangel de la Fuente (PRI)
 5. Candelario Pérez Malibrán (PRI)

Tlaxcala
 1.  (PRI)
 2.  (PRI)

Veracruz
 1.  (PRI)
 2.  (PRI)
 3.  (PRI)
 4.  (PRI)
 5.  (PRI)
 6.  (PRI)
 7.  (PRI)
 8.  (PRI)
 9.  (PRI)
 10.  (PRI)
 11.  (PRI)
 12.  (PRI)
 13.  (PRI)
 14.  (PRI)

Yucatán
 1. (PRI)
 2. (PRI)
 3. Víctor Manzanilla Schaffer (PRI)

Zacatecas
 1. Calixto Medina Medina (PRI)
 2. Rosa María Ortiz de Castañeda (PRI)
 3. Antonio Ruelas Cuevas (PRI)
 4. Juan Martínez Tobías (PRI)

Notes

External links 
 Deputies of the XLVII Legislature
 Diario de los Debates (Chamber of Senators)
 Diario de los Debates (Chamber of Deputies)
 Official page of the Chamber of Deputies
 Official page of the Senate

Congress of Mexico by session
1967 in Mexico